The Great Wall of China is the first posthumous collection of short stories by Franz Kafka published in Germany in 1931. It was edited by Max Brod and Hans Joachim Schoeps and collected previously unpublished short stories, incomplete stories, fragments and aphorisms written by Kafka between 1917 and 1924. The first English translation by Willa and Edwin Muir was published by Martin Secker in 1933. The same translation was published in 1946 by Schocken Books.

Contents
 Introductory note by Edwin Muir
 Longer Stories
 Investigations of a Dog
 The Burrow
 The Great Wall of China
 The Giant Mole
 Short Stories and Fables
 The Hunter Gracchus
 The Married Couple 
 My Neighbor
 A Common Confusion 
 The Bridge
 The Bucket Rider 
 A Crossbreed 
 The Knock at the Manor Gate
 The City Coat of Arms 
 The Silence of the Sirens
 Prometheus 
 The Truth about Sancho Panza 
 The Problem of Our Laws 
 On Parables
 A Little Fable 
 Aphorisms
 "He"
 Reflections on Sin, Pain, Hope, and the True Way

Publication history (in English)

1933 London: Martin Secker, xvi+285 pp., hardcover; first UK edition, subtitled and Other Pieces
1946 London: Secker and Warburg, 159 pp., hardcover; Revised and reset edition
1946 New York: Schocken Books, xix+315 pp., hardcover; first US edition, subtitled Stories and Reflections

1931 short story collections
Books published posthumously
Short story collections by Franz Kafka
Martin Secker books
Kiepenheuer & Witsch books